Albert Facon (born 11 November 1943) is a French politician who was a member of the National Assembly of France. He represented the 14th constituency of the Pas-de-Calais department,  and was a member of the Socialist group.

References

1943 births
Living people
People from Vichy
Socialist Party (France) politicians
Deputies of the 12th National Assembly of the French Fifth Republic
Deputies of the 13th National Assembly of the French Fifth Republic